Beatrice Cori (real name Beatrice Cagnoni) (March 20, 1943 - February 8, 2000) was a television presenter and model. She introduced the Italian entry sung by Alan Sorrenti in Eurovision Song Contest 1980.

References

External links  
 

1943 births
2000 deaths
Italian female models
Italian television presenters
Italian women television presenters